Christian hardcore or Christcore is a subcategory of  hardcore punk bands which promote Christian belief. The method and extent of doing so varies between bands. Christian hardcore bands have often openly stated their beliefs and employ Christian imagery in their lyrics, and may be considered a part of the Christian music industry.

Fans of Christian hardcore music are not exclusively believers in the Christian religion. Owing to innovation in the hardcore movement such as Extol, Nobody Special, Zao, Living Sacrifice, and the hardcore movement in general, the audience has become less exclusive.

Related genres
Christian punk
Christian rock
Christian alternative rock
Christian metal

See also
List of Christian hardcore bands

References

External links
Christian Hardcore Interviews and Information
God Save the Teens: Local Kids Seek a New Kind of Church Through Hardcore and Hip-Hop by Lauren Sandler in the Village Voice 30 May - 5 June 2001
Review As I Lay Dying and Norma Jean by Ben Bishop in HM Magazine
Rock and Pop > Christian Punk and Hardcore in the Yahoo! Directory

Magazines and sites
HM
The Full Armor of God Broadcast

 
Hardcore
Hardcore